Deux-Sèvres is a French department. Deux-Sèvres literally means "two Sèvres": the Sèvre Nantaise and the Sèvre Niortaise are two rivers which have their sources in the department. It had a population of 374,878 in 2019.

In history and literature
Deux-Sèvres was one of the 83 original départements created during the French Revolution on 4 March 1790. The land had been part of the ancient province of Poitou.

Departmental borders were changed in 1973 when the inhabitants of the little commune of Puy-Saint-Bonnet became formally associated with the rapidly growing adjacent commune of Cholet, which is in the neighbouring department of Maine-et-Loire. To prevent the associated communes from being administered in separate departments, Puy-Saint-Bonnet was transferred into Maine-et-Loire.

Deux-Sevres features in Son Excellence Eugene Rougon, a novel by Emile Zola in his Rougon-Macquart series, when Rougon visits Niort, the departmental capital, to open a new rail line to Angers (chapter 10).

Geography and economics
The climate is mild, the annual temperature averaging 11 degrees Celsius.

The département remains rural: three-quarters of the area consists of arable land. Wheat and oats are the main products grown, as well as potatoes, apples, and walnuts. Niort is the center for growing vegetables and angelica. Some beetroot is grown in the district of Melle. Vineyards are numerous in the north, and there are some in the south.

The département is also well known for the breeding of cattle, mules, and horses. The Parthenais breed of cattle is named after the town of Parthenay in the north of the département. Also, dairy products are produced in significant quantities (butter in Échiré and goats' cheese.

Some quarries are in operation (in Mazières-en-Gâtine, La Peyratte or Saint-Varent), as well as lime extraction operations.

Textiles, leather-tanning, and flour milling were the traditional industries of Niort, the capital and major city. Nowadays, Niort, with 60,000 inhabitants, is an important commercial and administrative center. In particular it is one of the main financial centers in France (fourth in rank after Paris, Lyon and Lille). Niort is the national headquarters of some of the major insurance companies in France ( (MAAF),  (MACIF),  (MAIF) and others) and regional headquarters of others such as Groupama. The regional headquarters of several national banks, including Banque Populaire and Crédit Agricole, are also located there. The services sector is also heavily represented in Niort, in consulting, accounting, brokerage and software. Chemistry, pharmacy (Boiron) and aeronautics (Zodiac Group, Leach International) are the main industries.

Textiles and shoe making, furnitures, mechanics, automotive (Heuliez and Irisbus), chemistry (Rhodia in Melle), food industry and food packaging are the major industries outside of the capital.

The unemployment rate in the département is very low (less than 5%) especially in the north-west, where many small and medium companies are developing rapidly.

The south-west of the département attracts tourists with the Marais Poitevin natural area; the Atlantic coast is close at hand.

Demographics 
Population development since 1801:

Principal towns

The most populous commune is Niort, the prefecture. As of 2019, there are 4 communes with more than 10,000 inhabitants:

Politics

The president of the Departmental Council is Coralie Denoues, elected in July 2021.

Current National Assembly Representatives

Transport
Niort in the south of the département is connected to Paris and Bordeaux by the A10 motorway, with Nantes by the A83, with La Rochelle and Poitiers]] by the N11. Another important road in the north of the département is the Route nationale 149 (RN149), which runs roughly east–west from Bressuire to Poitiers, passing around the outskirts of Parthenay. This section of the RN149 forms part of the European route E62 from Nantes to Genoa. The road originally ran from Nantes, but has been bypassed in various stages by the new RN249 dual carriageway.  The old section from Nantes to Bressuire has been either renamed or downgraded to the D149.

The north and south of the département are connected by relatively minor roads, with the D743 and D748 linking Niort to Parthenay and Bressuire respectively, whilst the D938 connects to Thouars.

The département has two railway stations on the TGV route between Paris and La Rochelle (Niort and Saint-Maixent), with a journey from Niort to Paris taking 2h15. It is also served by several TER Nouvelle-Aquitaine regional railway routes, including a route from Poitiers via Niort to La Rochelle, a route from Niort to Saintes, and a route from Tours to Thouars and Bressuire. The région of Nouvelle-Aquitaine provides inter-urban bus service that connects the towns and villages of the département.

There are no airports with scheduled airline service within the département, although  is used for private movements. The nearest commercial airports are at Poitiers (Poitiers - Biard Airport), La Rochelle (La Rochelle - Île de Ré Airport) and Nantes (Nantes Atlantique Airport).

Gallery

Notable people 
Famous births in the département:
 Françoise d'Aubigné, marquise de Maintenon (1635–1719), second wife of Louis XIV
 Jacques de Liniers (Santiago de Liniers y Bremond) (1753–1810) 
 Louis-Marcelin, marquis de Fontanes (1757–1821), poet and politician
 Henri-Georges Clouzot (1904–1977), film director
 Laurent Cantet (1961), Palme d'Or at the Festival de Cannes 2008, for the movie Entre les murs
 Catherine Breillat (1948), film maker and novelist
 Jean-Hugues Anglade (1955), actor
 René Caillié (1799–1838) explorer, and the first European to return alive from the town of Timbuktu

Famous people related to the département:
 Jean-Baptiste Baujault, French sculptor
 Ségolène Royal (1953), former candidate for the 2007 French presidential election, former representative of the department at the National Assembly, former President of the Poitou-Charentes region (2004-2014) and Minister of Ecology since 2014.

See also
Anjou wine
Arrondissements of the Deux-Sèvres department
Cantons of the Deux-Sèvres department
Communes of the Deux-Sèvres department

References

External links

  Prefecture website 
  Departmental council website

 
1790 establishments in France
Departments of Nouvelle-Aquitaine
States and territories established in 1790